Clayton High School is a public high school in Clayton, North Carolina.

Notable alumni
 Chris Archer, MLB player and 2x All-Star selection
 Gary Clark, NBA player
 Johnny Dutch, USA Track & Field athlete
 Kendra Harrison, world record setting hurdler
 Corey Lee, MLB player
 Evan Phillips, MLB player
 James Talacek, professional aquanaut

References

External links 
 
 Clayton Marching Comets web site

Educational institutions established in 1901
Public high schools in North Carolina
Schools in Johnston County, North Carolina
1901 establishments in North Carolina